Aera, formerly known as Asahi Journal, is a Japanese weekly magazine printed in gravure, published by Asahi Shimbun. The magazine combines photographs and news stories. In May 1988, Aera replaced Asahi Journal with more weekly substance.

The cover story is called Person in Focus. Eiichirō Sakata takes cover photos for Aera, and since the person on the cover is the photographer, it is a self-portrait.

The title Aera is derived from the Latin word that means "era" in English, and a backronym said to mean "Asahi Shimbun Extra Research and Analysis."

Aera'''s advertisement in the Asahi features topical dajare (word play).

==People who have appeared in Aera's cover story Person in Focus==Issue number and names in Japanese and roman script.''

Issues of 1998
 May 11 issue - Meja
 June 8 issue - Jean Reno
 June 28 issue - Ricky Martin
 August 3 issue - Joaquín Cortés
 September 21 issue - James Turrell
 November 2 issue - Yoshio Taniguchi
 November 9 issue - Alek Wek
 November 16 issue - Richard Branson
 December 21 issue - Faye Wong

Issues of 1999
 January 18 issue - Philippe Starck
 January 25 issue - LeAnn Rimes
 May 31 issue - Jewel
 June 28 issue - Yayoi Kusama
 November 15 issue - Haley Joel Osment
 November 29 issue - Jane Birkin
 December 13 issue - Alina Kabayeva
 December 20 issue - Milla Jovovich

Issues of 2000
 January 10 issue - Carly Fiorina
 January 17 issue - Tatsuya Fujiwara
 February 7 issue - Andrew Weil
 February 14 issue - Carlos Ghosn
 February 21 issue - Sergio García
 February 28 issue - Daniel Keyes
 March 13 issue - Gerhard Schröder
 March 20 issue - Charlotte Church
 March 27 issue - Yasser Arafat
 April 17 issue - Yoshirō Mori
 April 24 issue - Émilie Dequenne
 May 8 issue - Ringo Shiina
 May 29 issue - Rickson Gracie
 June 12 issue - Robin Williams
 July 31 issue - Enrique Iglesias
 September 11 issue - Valery Gergiev
 September 18 issue - Vladimir Putin
 October 2 issue - Koji Murofushi
 October 9 issue - Desmond Morris
 October 23 issue - Nikita Mikhalkov
 November 6 issue - Hideki Shirakawa
 November 13 issue - Zhang Ziyi
 December 4 issue - Jeff Bezos

Issues of 2001
 January 8 issue - Tiger Woods
 February 5 issue - Ibrahim Ferrer
 March 5 issue - Hiroyasu Shimizu
 March 19 issue - Koichi Wakata
 March 26 issue - Vladimir Ashkenazy
 April 16 issue - Ichiro Suzuki, Tsuyoshi Shinjo
 April 23 issue - Kitarō
 May 7 issue - Ian Thorpe
 May 14 issue - Junichiro Koizumi
 May 28 issue - Karrie Webb
 June 11 issue - Christian Bale
 June 18 issue - Naomi Kawase
 June 25 issue - Yoshida Brothers
 August 27 issue - Linus Torvalds
 September 17 issue - Hironobu Sakaguchi
 November 5 issue - Plácido Domingo
 December 10 issue - Nina Ananiashvili

Issues of 2002
 February 4 issue - Hamid Karzai
 February 18 issue - Donald Keene
 February 25 issue - John Cameron Mitchell
 March 4 issue - José Carreras
 March 25 issue - Muhammad Yunus
 April 8 issue - Hideki Matsui
 April 15 issue - Sepp Blatter
 May 13 issue - Junichi Inamoto
 May 20 issue - Morgan Freeman
 June 3 issue - Alicia Keys
 July 1 issue - Kelly Chen
 July 8 issue - Tommy Lee Jones
 July 22 issue - Romano Prodi
 August 19 issue - Nicolas Cage
 September 9 issue - Cai Guo-Qiang
 September 23 issue - Mariko Mori
 September 30 issue - Megumi Yokota
 October 7 issue - John Woo
 October 21 issue - Zico
 October 28 issue - Koichi Tanaka
 December 9 issue - Annika Sörenstam
 December 22 issue - Leonardo DiCaprio

Issues of 2003
 January 6 issue - Ayumi Hamasaki
 February 17 issue - Jon Bon Jovi
 April 14 issue - Astro Boy
 June 2 issue - Yuta Tabuse
 June 16 issue - Keanu Reeves
 July 14 issue - t.A.T.u.
 August 11 issue - Lisa Marie Presley
 September 8 issue - Miuccia Prada
 October 6 issue - Alice Walker
 November 24 issue - Quentin Tarantino
 December 22 issue - Riccardo Muti

Issues of 2004
 January 5 issue - Hillary Clinton
 January 19 issue - Paula Radcliffe
 January 26 issue - Nigel Kennedy
 February 9 issue - Shigetoshi Hasegawa
 February 16 issue - Norah Jones
 March 1 issue - Matthew Bourne
 March 8 issue - Daniela Hantuchová
 April 26 issue - Sofia Coppola
 May 17 issue - Hiromi Uehara
 July 5 issue - Won Bin
 July 12 issue - Yūya Yagira
 August 2 issue - Tobey Maguire
 September 20 issue - Bill Clinton
 October 4 issue - Lester R. Brown
 October 18 issue - Jonny Wilkinson
 October 30 issue - Kosuke Kitajima
 November 8 issue - Ken Watanabe
 November 29 issue - Lee Byung-hun
 December 13 issue - Takuma Sato
 December 20 issue - Simon Rattle
 December 27 issue - Emmanuelle Béart

Issues of 2005
 January 24 issue - Gwyneth Paltrow
 January 31 issue - Andrew Lloyd Webber
 February 21 issue - Colin Farrell
 March 7 issue - Alain Ducasse
 March 14 issue - Peter Schreier
 May 23 issue - Hayley Westenra
 July 11 issue - Jack Johnson
 July 18 issue - Bruno Ganz
 November 7 issue - Rei Asami
 November 14 issue - Dan Gillmor
 November 21 extra issue - Soichi Noguchi
 November 28 issue - Natsuhiko Kyogoku
 December 5 issue - Eric Schmidt
 December 12 issue - Dardenne brothers
 December 19 issue - Kaiji Moriyama
 December 26 issue - Li Yundi

Issues of 2006
 January 2–9 issue - Kotooshu Katsunori
 January 16 issue - Nikolaus Harnoncourt
 January 23 issue - Asashoryu Akinori
 January 30 issue - Takafumi Horie
 February 6 issue - Aoi Miyazaki
 February 27 issue - Shizuka Arakawa
 March 6 issue - Noel Gallagher
 March 13 issue - Toots Thielemans
 March 27 issue - Wangari Maathai
 April 10 issue - Kotaro Oshio
 April 24 issue - Masahiko Fujiwara
 May 29 issue - James Blunt
 July 3 issue - Juanes
 October 23 issue - Paula Creamer
 November 13 issue - Dominique Perrault
 December 4 issue - Bill Viola
 December 11 issue - Roger Federer
 December 25 issue - Beyoncé Knowles

Issues of 2007
 January 22 issue - Desmond Tutu
 January 29 issue - Michelle Wie
 February 19 issue - Al Gore
 March 12 issue - George Soros
 March 19 issue - Steve Chen, Chad Hurley
 April 23 issue - Rinko Kikuchi
 June 4 issue - Kirsten Dunst
 August 6 issue - M.I.A.
 November 19 issue - Takashi Murakami
 December 3 issue - Raul Midón

Issues of 2008
 March 17 issue - Jude Law
 May 12 issue - Namie Amuro
 June 23 issue - B'z
 July 14 issue - Diablo Cody
 November 10 issue - Masumi Kuwata

Issues of 2009
 January 16 issue - Daisuke Matsuzaka
 March 19 issue - Hidetoshi Nakata
 April 27 issue - Liam Gallagher
 August 3 issue - Lady Gaga
 August 17 issue - Richard Gere

References

External links
 Digital Edition of AERA (in Japanese)

1988 establishments in Japan
Asahi Shimbun Company
Photography magazines published in Japan
Weekly magazines published in Japan
Magazines established in 1988
Mass media in Osaka